Orlando Chaves may refer to:

Orlando Chaves (bishop) (1900–1981), Brazilian archbishop
Orlando Chaves (water polo) (born 1963), Brazilian water polo player
Orlando Chaves (weightlifter) (1921–1976), Guyanese weightlifter